Lee Marshall (born Marshall Aaron Mayer; November 28, 1949 – April 26, 2014) was an American professional wrestling announcer formerly of the American Wrestling Association (AWA), World Championship Wrestling (WCW) and Women of Wrestling (WOW!).

Professional wrestling announcing

World Wrestling Federation
Marshall was briefly with the World Wrestling Federation as a ring announcer. He was the ring announcer for the Los Angeles portion of WrestleMania 2.

American Wrestling Association
Marshall joined the broadcast team when the AWA Championship Wrestling show was on ESPN.

World Championship Wrestling
He later joined World Championship Wrestling (WCW), where he was known as "Stagger Lee".  Marshall was the co-host of WCW Thunder alongside Bobby Heenan and Tony Schiavone. He interviewed and announced alongside Mike Tenay and Scott Hudson on WCW Saturday Night as well. A staple of WCW Monday Nitro was his regular cracking of "Weasel" jokes directed at Heenan, which would conclude his road reports.

Marshall was also one of the announcers at the 1996 World War 3 pay-per-view at the Norfolk Scope in Norfolk, Virginia, covering the third ring with Larry Zbyzsko. During the early stages of the three-ring, 60-man Battle Royal, the Four Horsemen and the Dungeon of Doom battled outside the ring and in the ensuing fight, Marshall was knocked down and repeatedly kicked legitimately to the head and chest by the Faces of Fear (Meng and The Barbarian) while on the floor. After the fight moved back toward the locker room, Marshall managed to get himself up and, after some difficulty (and questioning why Zbyzsko didn't come to his aid), finished commentating the match from his designated announcing position.

Los Angeles

In 1986, Marshall was the ring announcer for the Los Angeles portion of WrestleMania 2. He was also involved in the Great Western Forum-based Women of Wrestling promotion and served as its play-by-play announcer. He was partnered with company owner David McLane, who served as the color commentator on the syndicated TV show, and worked with Bobby "The Brain" Heenan, the color commentator on the WOW pay-per-view on February 4, 2001.

Radio and commercials
Marshall was also a longtime radio announcer, working at such stations as KABC and KGFJ (now KYPA) and KBLA and KHJ in Los Angeles, KRIZ in Phoenix and CKLW in Windsor, Ontario, Canada (Detroit). At CKLW, he was one of the anchors for the station's "20/20 News" updates, and at KDAY, he was "King News", bringing attention to the issue of gang violence. Marshall made an appearance in rap video "We're All in the Same Gang" as King News telling the gangbangers "they just don't get it."

Other works
Marshall also did various voices on Larryboy: The Cartoon Adventures, including the narrator.

His bass voice is notable within announcing circles, holding the premiere position in that field, the voice of Tony the Tiger (succeeding Thurl Ravenscroft), a position for which Marshall was contracted until 2014.

Death
Marshall died in Santa Monica on April 26, 2014 of esophageal cancer. He was 64 years old.

Awards and accomplishments
Wrestling Observer Newsletter awards
Worst Television Announcer (1998)

References

External links
 
 Online World of Wrestling profile

1949 births
2014 deaths
American color commentators
American male voice actors
American radio personalities
American Wrestling Association
Deaths from cancer in California
People from Los Angeles
Professional wrestling announcers